Sri Sravanthi Movies is an Indian film production company established by Sravanthi Ravi Kishore and located in Hyderabad. It is one of India's largest film production companies with over 30 years of contribution to Telugu cinema. Its first film was Ladies Tailor with Rajendra Prasad in 1986. Shivam (2015), starring Ram Pothineni and Raashi Khanna, was a landmark film for the company, which celebrated its 30th anniversary in 2015.

Film production

References

External links 

 Sri Sravanthi Movies on IMDb
 Sri Sravanthi Movies on YouTube
 Sri Sravanthi Movies on Facebook
 Sri Sravanthi Movies on Twitter

Film production companies based in Hyderabad, India
Indian companies established in 1986
1986 establishments in Andhra Pradesh